Stanislaw Więciorek (born 10 April 1965) is a former Polish international rugby union player. He had played for 13 clubs throughout his rugby career including two French clubs (SA Vierzon and RC Istres).

Career

Więciorek is Poland's most capped international having earned 65 caps for his country. He made his international debut back in 1987 and retired from international rugby in 2007. He continued to play at club level until 2009.

Coaching

He is currently coaching Pogoń Aventa Siedlce in Poland.

References

1965 births
Polish rugby union players
Living people
Sportspeople from Lublin
Lechia Gdańsk rugby players
Rugby union props